Don Juan (foaled 1869) was an Australian bred thoroughbred racehorse who is most notable for winning the 1873 Melbourne Cup.

Background

Don Juan was bred by South Australian politician and pastoralist John Baker.  Baker then sold the horse to his eventual trainer James Wilson for £50. 
The ownership of Don Juan caused much controversy, with the listed owner being Mr W. Johnstone.  It was revealed however that Johnstone simply allowed his name to be used, and the horse was actually owned by  bookmaker Joe "Leviathan" Thompson.

Racing career

On 23 May 1872,  Don Juan made his racing debut as a two-year-old at Morphettville.  He finished unplaced over the distance of 12 furlongs (2,400m).

Don Juan did not race as a three-year-old but was still nominated for the 1873 Melbourne Cup as a maiden.  This allowed the horse to be allotted a low weight of 6st 12 lb (43.5 kg).

On 7 November 1873, Don Juan started the 3/1 favourite in the Melbourne Cup and won by 3.5 lengths in a then record time for the race of 3:36.00.  Days after the race protesters had made allegations against Don Juan and his win in the Melbourne Cup. The complaint was that Don Juan had been nominated and entered into the Melbourne Cup as a four year old, however was apparently over the age of four. The Victoria Racing Club found the allegations to be untrue.

A day after winning the Melbourne Cup, Don Juan was successful in the Royal Park Stakes at Flemington. The next day he won the Flemington Plate over a distance of 24 furlongs (4,800m).   Don Juan raced once more on the 1 January 1874 when successful in the VRC Canterbury Plate over 20 furlongs (4,000m).

In February 1874, Don Juan was on a training gallop at St Albans Park, Victoria when he suffered soreness and blood was noticed in his nostrils.  He was returned to his stall and reportedly died suddenly.  An autopsy revealed internal bleeding and the cause of death was due to an inch long rent found in his heart.

Pedigree

References 

Australian racehorses
Racehorses bred in Australia
Racehorses trained in Australia
1869 racehorse births
1874 racehorse deaths
Thoroughbred family 24
Melbourne Cup winners